Something Good – Negro Kiss is a short silent film from 1898 of a couple kissing and holding hands. It is believed to depict the earliest on-screen kiss involving African Americans and is known for departing from the prevalent and purely stereotypical presentation of racist caricature in popular culture at the time it was made. The film was a lost film until its rediscovery in 2017, and was added to the American National Film Registry in 2018.

Production 
In Something Good, a well-dressed African American couple exchanges several kisses. Between kisses they hold and swing each other's hands and laugh together. The chemistry in the performances is described as "palpable," conveying an "unmistakable sense of naturalness, pleasure, and amusement."  A slightly longer version came to light in 2021; this version shows the couple before they embrace, and includes the "prelude before the kisses, with wooing, refusal and negotiation.” The longer version was produced at the same time and may have been produced for the international market. Research notes that alternate versions were sold and separately listed with varying lengths. The longer version is also from a perspective point further away and inverted, with the actors on opposite sides from the first version, although whether this was a mistake in production or reproduction is unknown. Scholars also perceive the longer film as more “vaudevillesque”, with more acting work, than the romance of the first.

When it was produced, it was likely presented with other shorts as a comedy vignette, a take-off on the 1896 film The Kiss. Something Good starred stage entertainers Saint Suttle and Gertie Brown. Suttle was a composer for popular theater and Brown a vaudeville circuit actress. The two also performed as dance partners. They were part of a group known as The Rag-Time Four, who performed variations on the popular cakewalk dance. They may have been at the film studio to perform in a cakewalk vignette, playing the film as impromptu.

The film was made in Chicago by director and producer William Selig, a film pioneer, who also had prior experience with staged minstrel shows. He used his own version of a Lumière cinématographe camera to shoot Something Good. Selig distributed the Selig Polyscope Company film through the Sears & Roebuck mail order catalog.

Rediscovery
Something Good nitrate film negative was rediscovered at an estate sale in Louisiana by an archivist from the University of Southern California in 2017. Reviewing the technical details of the film, thereby dating it with the film stock and perforation holes, catalogs and sales material, scholars at USC and the University of Chicago were able to identify the film's production history. The USC Hugh M. Hefner Moving Image Archive claims the copyright to the restored version of the film, which it published on Vimeo.

A seconds longer version was rediscovered in the National Library of Norway in 2021, which includes the lead-up to the kisses.  It is one of the oldest films in the National Library collection. This copy was included in a reel found in the town of Leksvik, and was housed in a barn until authorities said it posed a risk of fire. Oral history suggests the film came to Norway when a Norwegian filmmaker wanted to assemble a projector in the early days of film and brought home film-reels from the US. It was at first misidentified in Oslo, where it was mistakenly catalogued as a Lumière film. News of the 2017 re-discovery in the United States caused the National Library to reexamine it and discover its provenance. Though scanned twice, the film still showed spots and malformations, but these films at the time were uncarefully produced, and those spots may always have been there. The film negative is deteriorating, held in the arctic facilities in the north of the country. 

Prior to the rediscovery, the film had little detail. It had circulated in the years it was made, often referenced along with racist films of the time.

See also
African American cinema
The Tramp and the Dog, an 1896 Selig film rediscovered on the same film strip as the Something Good version in the Norway National Library.

References

External links

African-American history between emancipation and the civil rights movement
American black-and-white films
American silent short films
Films shot in Chicago
United States National Film Registry films
1890s romance films
African-American romance films
1890s rediscovered films
Rediscovered American films
1898 short films
1890s American films
Selig Polyscope Company films
Articles containing video clips
Kissing